Federica Brignone (born 14 July 1990) is an Italian World Cup alpine ski racer. She competes in all alpine disciplines, with a focus on giant slalom and super-G. Brignone won the World Cup overall title in 2020, becoming the first Italian female to achieve this feat. She is also an Olympic and World Championship medalist. At the 2022 Winter Olympics, she won a silver medal in the giant slalom and a bronze in the combined.

Ski racing
Born in Milan, Lombardy, Brignone made her World Cup debut at age 17 in December 2007, and her first full season on the World Cup circuit was in 2010. At her first World Championships in 2011, Brignone won the silver medal in the giant slalom.  In December 2012, Brignone underwent surgery on her right ankle to remove a bothersome cyst, and missed the rest of the 2013 season. 

During the World Cup finals at Aspen in March 2017, Brignone won giant slalom to lead an Italian podium sweep, with teammates Sofia Goggia and Marta Bassino. She was part of two other hat tricks by Italy, both in downhill: as runner-up at Bad Kleinkirchheim in 2018, and a third place at Bansko in 2020. 

At the 2018 Winter Olympics in PyeongChang, South Korea, Brignone won her first Olympic medal, the bronze in the giant slalom. 

In March 2020, Brignone earned the overall crystal globe with 1378 points – ahead of Mikaela Shiffrin (1225) and Petra Vlhova (1189) – becoming the first and to date only Italian woman to win World Cup overall title. With five wins and eleven podiums during the season, she added two more globes for the giant slalom and combined titles.

Brignone won the silver medal in the giant slalom and the bronze medal in the combined at the 2022 Winter Olympics in Beijing.

Through January 2023, Brignone has 21 World Cup victories and 53 podiums, with 28 in giant slalom, fifteen in super-G, four in downhill, and six in combined.

Personal
Brignone is the daughter of Maria Rosa Quario (b.1961), an alpine racer in the late 1970s and early 1980s, who had four World Cup wins and fifteen podiums, all in slalom. 

She has been engaged to French skier Nicolas Raffort.

World Cup results

Season titles
 4 titles – (1 Overall, 1 GS, 1 AC, 1 SG)

Season standings

^

Race victories

Podiums

World Championship results

Olympic results

National titles
Brignone has won seven national championships at individual senior level.

Italian Alpine Ski Championships
Super-G: 2017 (1)
Giant slalom: 2011, 2017, 2018 (3)
Slalom: 2021 (1)
Combined: 2016, 2017 (2)

See also
Italian female skiers most successful World Cup race winner
List of FIS Alpine Ski World Cup women's race winners

References

External links
 
 

Italian Winter Sports Federation – (FISI) – alpine skiing – Federica Brignone – 
 – 

1990 births
Italian female alpine skiers
Alpine skiers at the 2010 Winter Olympics
Alpine skiers at the 2014 Winter Olympics
Alpine skiers at the 2018 Winter Olympics
Alpine skiers at the 2022 Winter Olympics
Olympic alpine skiers of Italy
Alpine skiers from Milan
Living people
Olympic silver medalists for Italy
Olympic bronze medalists for Italy
Medalists at the 2018 Winter Olympics
Medalists at the 2022 Winter Olympics
Olympic medalists in alpine skiing
Alpine skiers of Centro Sportivo Carabinieri
FIS Alpine Ski World Cup champions